There are a number of modes of transport in Seychelles. Seychelles possesses transportation systems that include 453km of roads (of which 400km are paved), seaports, and airports. The country lacks railways. The main seaport is Victoria, and Seychelles has no merchant marine. There are fourteen airports in Seychelles, the major ones including Seychelles International Airport and Praslin Island Airport. Of the fourteen airports, six have runways that are paved.

In rural areas, especially on La Digue, a popular way of public transport is by using ox-carts.

References
Much of the material in this article is sourced from the CIA World Factbook.